Rear-Admiral Jack Kenneth Highton CB CBE (2 September 1904 – 17 February 1988) was Chief Staff Officer to Commander-in-Chief, Plymouth (1957–60), and Aide-de-Camp to Queen Elizabeth II.

Naval career
Jack Kenneth Highton was the son of John Hay Highton and was born on 2 September 1904. Following his education at Bedford Modern School he entered the Royal Navy in 1922 and was appointed to the training battleship HMS Thunderer. From 1935–37 he was Secretary to the Commodore, New Zealand Squadron and from 1938 to 1940 he was Secretary to the Flag Officer (Submarines).

From 1943 to 52 he was Secretary to Sir Arthur J Power, Admiral of the Fleet, and in 1957 he was appointed Chief Staff Officer to the Commander in Chief (Plymouth). He was promoted to Rear-Admiral in the same year and served as ADC to H.M. The Queen. He was appointed OBE in 1946, CBE in 1952 and CB in 1959.

He married Eileen Flack in 1933 and they settled in Woodbridge, Suffolk where Highton died on 17 February 1988.

References 

Commanders of the Order of the British Empire
Companions of the Order of the Bath
Royal Navy rear admirals
People educated at Bedford Modern School
1904 births
1988 deaths
Royal Navy officers of World War II
Royal Navy logistics officers